The Central New South Wales languages (Central NSW) are a largely geographic grouping of Australian Aboriginal languages within the traditional Pama–Nyungan family, partially overlapping the Kuri subgroup of the Yuin–Kuric languages.

The languages most often included are:
Wiradhuric (Wiradhuri, Ngiyambaa, Gamilaraay)
Dyangadi (Dyangadi, Nganyaywana)
Worimi (Worimi, Awabakal)
Muruwarri
Barranbinja

Bowern and Atkinson use the term Central NSW to group the Wiradhuric languages with Muruwaric. Elsewhere it is known as Central Inland NSW.

References